Jamison Ratu Gibson-Park (born 23 February 1992) is a rugby union player who plays as a scrum-half. Born in New Zealand, he plays for Leinster Rugby and represents Ireland after qualifying through the three-year residency rule. He has also represented the Māori All Blacks.  His nickname is "Gypsy Danger" after the character in the film Pacific Rim.

He represented Taranaki in the ITM Cup. He made his provincial debut in 2012 and his strong performances saw him named in the  squad for the 2013, 2014 and 2015 Super Rugby seasons; and he also played for the Wellington-based Super Rugby franchise the Hurricanes.

Early life
Gibson-Park was born, and spent the first 10 years of his life on Great Barrier Island. From there he moved to Gisborne.
He ended up at Gisborne Boys' High School, where he excelled in its first XV, being named in the New Zealand Secondary Schools squad in his final year. He then got picked up out of school by the Taranaki Academy where he moved at the start of 2011.

Club career

Taranaki
Gibson-Park debuted for Taranaki in 2012, playing the season's first two Ranfurly Shield matches against King Country and Wanganui. He was contracted and made the Taranaki National Provincial Championship squad, making his NPC debut starting at scrum-half against Bay of Plenty. He made an immediate impact with his decisive running and ability to spot a gap. His ability to put a player into space also caught the eye. Gibson-Park was one of the then break-out stars of the 2012 ITM Cup in his debut year for Taranaki, scoring four tries in eleven appearances and was awarded the most promising player of the year ahead of finalists Mitch Brown and Seta Tamanivalu. His performance didn't go unnoticed by the national media or the Super Rugby coaches. He received high praise from television, print and radio commentators and had been named one of the five promising players of the year by the Rugby Almanack.

Blues
In 2013 he was signed by the Super Rugby side the Blues. He earned his first Super Rugby start in the Blues 21–28 loss to the Bulls in round four of the competition. Gibson-Park was also a part of the Blues team to face France, getting his chance because of injury with All Blacks halfback Piri Weepu.

Gibson-Park had a slow start to the 2014 Super Rugby season because of stress fracture but finished the season appearing in two matches of rounds ten and eighteen coming on as a replacement against the Hurricanes and Crusaders. 2015 was a strong year as he started at halfback majority of the year, who along with Brendon O'Connor were the only players who had played in every game that season for the Auckland franchise. Gibson-Park recorded one try while also being pointed out by many commentators as a key figure for the Blues, in what was his final season.

Hurricanes
October 2015, Gibson-Park was the last to join the Hurricanes 39-man Super Rugby squad after head coach Chris Boyd looked to fill gaps at halfback after the departure of Chris Smylie to Italy. He joined alongside fellow Taranaki halfback Te Toiroa Tahuriorangi.

Leinster
On 12 May 2016, Park left New Zealand to join Irish region Leinster in the Pro12 ahead of the 2016–17 season.
In September 2017, Gibson-Park and Leinster captain Isa Nacewa were denied entry in to South Africa due to visa restrictions. The pair had been due to play two matches for Leinster in the Pro14 against the Southern Kings and the Cheetahs. He made his 100th appearance for Leinster coming off the bench in a 16–6 victory over Munster in the 2021 Pro14 Grand Final.

International career
In 2012 Gibson-Park trialled for the New Zealand under-20 side, but he missed selection.

Māori All Blacks
Although the then 20-year-old Gibson-Park had only played eleven matches for Taranaki, Jamie Joseph, the Māori All Blacks coach, selected him for the 2012 end of year tour to England, playing against domestic club team Leicester Tigers, an invitational RFU Championship XV, and ending against the Canadian national team.

Ireland
In August 2019, Gibson-Park became eligible to play for Ireland under the World Rugby's eligibility rules.

In October 2020, he was named in the Ireland squad by coach Andy Farrell for the remaining matches of the 2020 Six Nations Championship. Gibson Park came off the bench against Italy for his first cap on 24 October 2020.

In November 2021, he was selected as the starting scrum-half for Ireland's test against Japan, scoring his first international try in a 60–5 victory. He kept his place for the visit of New Zealand a week later and played a key role in a 29–20 win over his native country. His performance against New Zealand earned him praise for his speed of service and work-rate in defence. He scored a try in Ireland's 30–24 loss against France in the 2022 Six Nations, and then another against Italy two weeks later in a 57–6 win.

International Tries 
As of 1 March 2022

References

External links

Jamison Gibson-Park at AllBlacks.com
Leinster profile
Pro14 profile

1992 births
Living people
New Zealand rugby union players
New Zealand Māori rugby union players
Māori All Blacks players
Blues (Super Rugby) players
Taranaki rugby union players
Rugby union scrum-halves
Rugby union players from Auckland
Hurricanes (rugby union) players
New Zealand expatriate rugby union players
Expatriate rugby union players in Ireland
New Zealand expatriate sportspeople in Ireland
Leinster Rugby players
Irish rugby union players
Ireland international rugby union players